WLPS-FM (89.5 FM) is a radio station broadcasting a Gospel Music format. WLPS-FM is licensed to Lumberton, North Carolina, United States. The station is currently owned by Billy Ray Locklear Evangelistic Association. The station was issued its callsign on November 23, 2005.

WLPS-FM also runs a TV station on DTV channel 14, WTNG-CD.

References

External links
 

Gospel radio stations in the United States
LPS-FM
Radio stations established in 1985
1985 establishments in North Carolina